Alfred Henry Skorbinski (born  in Port Elizabeth) is a South African rugby union player that played first class rugby for the  from 2011 to 2013 and for the  from 2014 to 2018. His regular position was centre.

He suffered a shoulder injury towards the end of the 2018 Currie Cup and announced his retirement from the sport.

Career

Youth and Varsity rugby

He played for the  side in the 2010 and 2011 Under-21 Provincial Championship competitions. He also represented university side  in the Varsity Cup competition in 2011, 2012 and 2013.

Leopards

In 2013, he played Vodacom Cup rugby for the first time, making two appearances. He scored two tries in the opening two matches of the 2013 Currie Cup First Division, eventually making eight starts in that competition.

Pumas

At the end of the 2013 season, it was announced that Skorbinski joined Nelspruit-based side  for the 2014 season. He was a member of the Pumas side that won the Vodacom Cup for the first time in 2015, beating  24–7 in the final. Skorbinski made a single appearances during the season and scored one try.

References

South African rugby union players
Living people
1990 births
Rugby union players from Port Elizabeth
Leopards (rugby union) players
Pumas (Currie Cup) players
Rugby union centres